Piptochaetium, or speargrass, is a genus of plants in the grass family, native to North and South America. Piptochaetium is a bunchgrass genus in the tribe Stipeae.

Some of its species have been included in the genus Stipa by some authors.

 Species
 Piptochaetium alpinum - Santa Catarina, Rio Grande do Sul
 Piptochaetium angolense - Coquimbo
 Piptochaetium angustifolium  - Coahuila, Tamaulipas, Nuevo León, México State
 Piptochaetium avenaceum — black oatgrass, blackseed needlegrass - United States (Texas to Florida north to Massachusetts + Michigan), Ontario, Tamaulipas, Nuevo León
 Piptochaetium avenacioides - Florida speargrass - Florida 
 Piptochaetium bicolor - Rio Grande do Sul, Argentina, Uruguay, Chile incl Juan Fernández Islands
 Piptochaetium brachyspermum  - Buenos Aires
 Piptochaetium brevicalyx - central + eastern Mexico
 Piptochaetium burkartianum  - Corrientes
 Piptochaetium cabrerae - Buenos Aires
 Piptochaetium calvescens - Buenos Aires, Uruguay
 Piptochaetium confusum - Uruguay, Rio Grande do Sul, Entre Rios
 Piptochaetium cucullatum  - Uruguay
 Piptochaetium featherstonei - Peru, Bolivia
 Piptochaetium fimbriatum - pinyon ricegrass - Arizona, Texas, New Mexico, Mexico, Guatemala
 Piptochaetium hackelii - Argentina, Uruguay
 Piptochaetium hirtum - Chile
 Piptochaetium indutum - Ecuador, Peru, Bolivia, Salta, Jujuy
 Piptochaetium jubatum - Uruguay
 Piptochaetium lasianthum - Uruguay, Argentina, Santa Catarina, Rio Grande do Sul
 Piptochaetium leiopodum - Buenos Aires, Uruguay
 Piptochaetium medium - Uruguay, Argentina, Brazil, Venezuela
 Piptochaetium montevidense - Uruguayan ricegrass - Argentina, Chile, Uruguay, Brazil, Paraguay, Bolivia, Peru, Ecuador, Venezuela
 Piptochaetium napostaense - Argentina
 Piptochaetium palustre - Santa Catarina
 Piptochaetium panicoides - Argentina, Chile, Uruguay, Brazil, Colombia, Bolivia, Peru, Ecuador, Venezuela
 Piptochaetium pringlei - Pringle's speargrass - Arizona, Texas, New Mexico, Mexico
 Piptochaetium ruprechtianum - Uruguay, Argentina, Brazil
 Piptochaetium sagasteguii - Peru
 Piptochaetium seleri - Mexico, Guatemala
 Piptochaetium setosum - bristly speargrass - Chile
 Piptochaetium stipoides - purple speargrass - Argentina, Chile, Uruguay, Brazil, Colombia; naturalized in Mexico, California
 Piptochaetium tovarii - Peru
 Piptochaetium uruguense - Argentina, Uruguay, Santa Catarina, Rio Grande do Sul, Paraguay, San Luis Potosí
 Piptochaetium virescens  - Mexico, Guatemala

 formerly included
see Nassella Stipa

References

External links 

Pooideae
Poaceae genera
Bunchgrasses of North America
Bunchgrasses of South America
Flora of Central America
Grasses of Argentina
Grasses of Brazil
Grasses of Mexico
Grasses of the United States